Notolestus sulcipennis is a species of beetle in the family Carabidae, the only species in the genus Notolestus.

References

Pterostichinae